The following is a non-comprehensive list of composers who have composed original music for the classical guitar, or music which has been arranged for it.

References

External links
Classical Guitar Composers List (three lists, sorted alphabetically, chronologically and by nationality)

 
Guitar